Narat Munin-noppamart is a Thai retired footballer who played as a centre-back and is the manager of Thai League 3 club Chamchuri United. He has made an appearance for the Thailand national football team for 1 game in 2006.

References

External links

1978 births
Living people
Narat Munin-noppamart
Narat Munin-noppamart
Association football defenders
Narat Munin-noppamart
Narat Munin-noppamart
Narat Munin-noppamart
Narat Munin-noppamart
Narat Munin-noppamart
Narat Munin-noppamart